Clay Lacy Aviation is a business aviation company founded at Van Nuys Airport (KVNY) in 1968 by Clay Lacy. Clay Lacy Aviation provides aircraft management, private air charter, aircraft maintenance, fixed-base operator (FBO) and other services to private and corporate clients. The company manages a nationwide fleet of more than 100 business jet aircraft, worth more than $1.5 billion, most of which are available for domestic and international private charter.
 
Operations centers, hangar facilities, and FAA Part 145 Repair Stations are located at Van Nuys Airport,  McClellan-Palomar Airport (KCRQ) near San Diego, and Waterbury-Oxford Airport (KOXC) near New York. Managed jet aircraft are based at general aviation airports across the U.S. Clay Lacy also operates a full-service FBO at Van Nuys Airport and began operating an FBO at Orange County's John Wayne Airport in January 2021. A Clay Lacy Aviation FBO at Waterbury-Oxford Airport is set for completion in 2022.

History
In 1968, Clay Lacy Aviation began operations as an on-demand jet charter operator at Van Nuys Airport in Los Angeles. At the time it was the only jet charter company west of the Mississippi. Early clients included Hollywood celebrities such as Danny Kaye, Frank Sinatra, Dean Martin, Sammy Davis, Jr., Carol Channing, Kirk Douglas, and Cary Grant. Over the next decade, the company began to offer aircraft management and maintenance services, and in 1981 established the first all-jet FBO.

In 2002, Clay Lacy expanded to the Pacific Northwest, with a hangar facility and full-service FBO at Boeing Field in Seattle. An additional 40,000 square-foot of hangar space was completed there in 2009. In 2016, the company opened an FAA Part 145 Repair Station and expanded its Seattle capabilities to include FAA-certified private jet charter services.
 
In 2006, Brian Kirkdoffer was promoted to company president. Kirkdoffer joined Clay Lacy as a pilot in 1990. He has flown more than 10,000 hours in Learjet and Gulfstream aircraft and holds four world aeronautical speed records. He acquired majority interest in Clay Lacy Aviation in 2013, and is currently president and CEO.

In 2011, the company opened a satellite office at McClellan-Palomar Airport near San Diego, adding an FAA Part 145 Repair Station in 2016.

In 2016, Clay Lacy acquired Key Air, a long-time East Coast private aviation company, with an operations and maintenance center at Waterbury-Oxford Airport near New York. An FAA Part 145 Repair Station was certified in 2018.

In 2017, the company's ground operations at Seattle's Boeing Field earned the first IS-BAH Stage II registration in North America. IS-BAH is the International Standard for Business Aviation Handling.

In 2018, Clay Lacy marked its fiftieth anniversary in April, opened its first New York office in June, and sold its Boeing Field Seattle operation in December.

In January 2019, the company opened a new round-the-clock aircraft MRO (maintenance, repair and overhaul) facility at its Van Nuys Airport FAA Part 145 Repair Station. In April 2019, the FAA awarded Part 145 certification to the Clay Lacy aircraft maintenance operation at Waterbury-Oxford Airport, in Oxford, Connecticut.

In January 2020, Embraer expanded the authorized service center designation at Clay Lacy's Van Nuys Airport FAA Repair Station to include Embraer Legacy and Embraer Praetor business jets. Clay Lacy has been an authorized service center for Embraer Phenom 100 and Embraer Phenom 300 aircraft since 2009 and began performing 10-year inspections on those aircraft in 2019.

Responding to the COVID-19 pandemic, in April 2020 Clay Lacy developed and implemented the CleanCheck health and safety standard throughout its aircraft operations, based on recommendations and best practices from the Centers for Disease Control and Prevention (CDC), the United States Department of Transportation, and the Federal Aviation Administration (FAA). Also in April, and in response to COVID-19, the company broadened its aircraft detailing capabilities with disinfecting services, available through Clay Lacy maintenance centers and mobile response teams.

In September 2020, the Orange County Board of Supervisors concluded a four-year evaluation process and awarded Clay Lacy a thirty-five year, 15-acre leasehold to design, build, and operate a full-service FBO with hangar, office space, and private terminal at John Wayne Airport in Santa Ana, California. Operations began in January 2021.

A third Clay Lacy FBO, to be developed on a 16-acre, 30-year leasehold at Waterbury-Oxford Airport, was announced by the Connecticut Airport Authority in October 2020. The 40,000-square-foot hangar and FBO will be completed in 2022, expanding the company's operations in the northeastern United States and creating an estimated 100 new jobs. An additional 120,000 square feet of aircraft maintenance and hangar space will be constructed in subsequent years.

In September 2021, Eviation Aircraft, a global manufacturer of all-electric aircraft, announced a partnership with Clay Lacy to provide electric charging as part of its Fixed Based Operator (FBO) network of services. The partnership represents the first FBO agreement that will allow charging of Eviation Alice aircraft in preparation for the plane's expected 2024 entry into service.

In November 2021, Transport Canada certified Clay Lacy's FAA Part 145 Repair Station at Waterbury-Oxford Airport to provide aircraft maintenance services for Canadian-registered business jets.

In November 2022, Clay Lacy Aviation was awarded the ARGUS Platinum rating for the 13th consecutive year along with the IS-BAO Stage III certification for the fifth consecutive year.

Sustainability strategy and carbon-neutral operations
Clay Lacy began executing a comprehensive nationwide sustainability strategy in 2020, partnering with World Kinect Energy Services, a subsidiary of World Fuel Services. Clay Lacy's strategy addresses every aspect of ground and flight operations at each of its facilities, as well as offering sustainability and carbon offset programs for customers. The strategy “incorporates renewable energy and sustainable fuels such as Renewable Diesel (RD) and Sustainable Aviation Fuel (SAF). It also establishes new sustainable purchasing strategies, EV charging stations and the use of carbon credits to offset emissions that cannot otherwise be reduced.”

In January 2021, Clay Lacy completed the installation of a 30,000-square-foot solar panel array at its Van Nuys Airport headquarters, These solar panels will offset the equivalent of 500 metric tons of  annually. Additionally, 200 conventional lighting fixtures were replaced with LED fixtures, and 44 electric vehicle charging stations were installed on the property.

In February 2021, 4AIR, a sustainability rating program for private aviation, selected Clay Lacy as its first official rating partner, providing carbon neutral validation of the company's facilities for 2020, and awarding “the first-ever carbon emissions offset rating for FBO and maintenance repair and overhaul facilities.”  4AIR gave its carbon neutral rating to Clay Lacy's facilities in Van Nuys, San Diego and Orange County, California, Seattle, Washington, and Oxford, Connecticut. Going forward, 4AIR will also evaluate and validate the company's carbon offset programs, as well as reductions from solar energy and renewable fuel use.

In March 2021, the company began offering SAF from World Fuel Services at its Van Nuys Airport and John Wayne Orange County Airport FBOs. Also in March, Air Elite announced that the Clay Lacy FBO at Van Nuys Airport has been carbon neutral since 2019.

In December 2021, Clay Lacy became the first company certified to the National Air Transportation Association’s Sustainability Standard for Aviation Businesses. This initiative was created to encourage FBOs, airports, and other aviation businesses to pursue flexible, cost-effective options to lower their carbon footprint.

Aviation training and education scholarships
In addition to direct donations to aviation training and educational programs, Clay Lacy offers pilot scholarships through the John D. Odegard School of Aerospace Sciences at the University of North Dakota and Orange Coast College in Costa Mesa, California, as well as aviation scholarships through the Flight Path Museum and Learning Center in Los Angeles. Scholarships are also available to students attending the LAUSD's North Valley Occupational Center Aviation Mechanics School. The company supports educational efforts through events such as Aviation Career Day at Van Nuys Airport, and mentoring and job shadowing programs.

Fleet

Safety and operational certifications
FAR Part 135 Air Carrier Certificate BKEA492C
FAR Part 145 Repair Station BKER301L – Los Angeles, California
FAR Part 145 Repair Station 4XGR883C – San Diego, California
FAR Part 145 Repair Station 81CR317D – Oxford, Connecticut
ARGUS Platinum
Wyvern Wingman
International Standard for Business Aviation Operations (IS-BAO) Stage III

References

Charter airlines of the United States
Airlines based in California
Aviation companies
Companies based in Los Angeles
American companies established in 1968
1968 establishments in California